FMDG may stand for:

 Fargo Moorhead Derby Girls, roller derby league based in North Dakota
 Fort Myers Derby Girls, roller derby league based in Florida